Whitman County is a county located in the U.S. state of Washington. As of the 2020 census, the population was 47,973. The county seat is Colfax, and its largest city is Pullman.

The county was formed from Stevens County in 1871. It is named after Marcus Whitman, a Presbyterian missionary who, with his wife Narcissa, was killed in 1847 by members of the Cayuse tribe.

Whitman County comprises the Pullman, Washington Metropolitan Statistical Area.

History
The area delineated by the future Washington state boundary began to be colonized at the start of the nineteenth century, both by Americans and Canadians. However, the majority of Canadian exploration and interest in the land was due to the fur trade, whereas American settlers were principally seeking land for agriculture and cattle raising. The Treaty of 1818 provided for dual control of this area by US and Canadian government officials. During this period, the future Washington Territory was divided into two administrative zones: Clark County and Lewis County (made official in 1845).

The dual-control concept was unwieldy and led to continual argument, and occasional conflict. The status of the Washington area was settled in 1846, when the Oregon Treaty ceded the land south of North latitude 49 degrees to American control.

In 1854, Skamania County was split from the original Clark County. Also in 1854, Walla Walla County was split from the new Skamania County. In 1863, Stevens County was split from Walla Walla County, and in 1871, a portion of Stevens County was set off to form Whitman County. The 1871 shape of Whitman County was considerably larger than its present boundary, as Adams, Franklin, and Lincoln counties were sectioned off from Whitman County in 1883. After that, Whitman County retained its shape, including through the period after Washington became the 42nd state of the Union in 1889.

Geography
Whitman County is part of the Palouse, a wide and rolling prairie-like region of the middle Columbia basin.

Rivers
Snake River
Palouse River
 Latah Creek
 Union Flat Creek
 Rock Creek
 Pine Creek

Lakes and reservoirs
 Lake Herbert G. West, formed from Lower Monumental Dam
 Lake Bryan, named for Dr. Enoch A. Bryan, behind the Little Goose Dam
 Lower Granite Lake, behind the Lower Granite Dam
 Rock Lake

Summits and peaks
 Tekoa Mountain (elevation: 4009')
 Kamiak Butte (elevation: 3641') 
 Steptoe Butte (elevation: 3612')
 Bald Butte (elevation: 3369)

Notable parks
 Steptoe Butte State Park
 Kamiak Butte County Park
 Palouse Falls State Park 
 Central Ferry State Park
 Boyer Park and Marina
 Wawawai County Park

Adjacent counties

Spokane County - north
Benewah County, Idaho - northeast
Latah County, Idaho - east
Nez Perce County, Idaho - southeast
Garfield County - south
Columbia County - south
Franklin County - southwest
Adams County - west
Lincoln County - northwest

Major highways

 U.S. Route 195
 State Route 23
 State Route 26
 State Route 27
 State Route 127
 State Route 270
 State Route 271
 State Route 272

Airports
Pullman–Moscow Regional Airport: Airport with GA operations and a few airline flights with Alaska Airlines
Port of Whitman Business Air Center Airport: Small GA Airport in Colfax

Demographics

2000 census
As of the census of 2000, there were 40,740 people, 15,257 households, and 8,055 families living in the county. The population density was 19 people per square mile (7/km2). There were 16,676 housing units at an average density of 8 per square mile (3/km2). The racial makeup of the county was 88.07% White, 1.53% Black or African American, 0.73% Native American, 5.55% Asian, 0.27% Pacific Islander, 1.22% from other races, and 2.63% from two or more races. 2.99% of the population were Hispanic or Latino of any race. 21.9% were of German, 9.8% English, 8.6% Irish, 8.3% United States or American and 6.6% Norwegian ancestry.

There were 15,257 households, out of which 24.60% had children under the age of 18 living with them, 44.20% were married couples living together, 6.20% had a female householder with no husband present, and 47.20% were non-families. 29.40% of all households were made up of individuals, and 7.10% had someone living alone who was 65 years of age or older. The average household size was 2.31 and the average family size was 2.91.

In the county, the population was spread out, with 18.10% under the age of 18, 32.60% from 18 to 24, 24.00% from 25 to 44, 16.00% from 45 to 64, and 9.20% who were 65 years of age or older. The median age was 25 years. For every 100 females there were 102.50 males. For every 100 females age 18 and over, there were 101.90 males.

The median income for a household in the county was $28,584, and the median income for a family was $44,830. Males had a median income of $33,381 versus $27,046 for females. The per capita income for the county was $15,298.  About 11.00% of families and 25.60% of the population were below the poverty line, including 16.50% of those under age 18 and 5.50% of those age 65 or over.

2010 census
As of the 2010 census, there were 44,776 people, 17,468 households, and 8,130 families living in the county. The racial makeup of the county was 84.6% white, 7.8% Asian, 1.7% black or African American, 0.7% American Indian, 0.2% Pacific islander, 1.4% from other races, and 3.6% from two or more races. Those of Hispanic or Latino origin made up 4.6% of the population. In terms of ancestry, 29.4% were German, 14.5% were English, 13.4% were Irish, 7.1% were Norwegian, and 4.1% were American.

Of the 17,468 households, 20.8% had children under the age of 18 living with them, 38.4% were married couples living together, 5.4% had a female householder with no husband present, 53.5% were non-families, and 32.7% of all households were made up of individuals. The average household size was 2.22 and the average family size was 2.86. The median age was 24.4 years.

The median income for a household in the county was $36,368 and the median income for a family was $61,598. Males had a median income of $46,663 versus $34,496 for females. The per capita income for the county was $19,506. About 10.7% of families and 27.6% of the population were below the poverty line, including 13.3% of those under age 18 and 5.7% of those age 65 or over.

Politics
Despite the county historically voting for Republicans, Whitman County has a reputation as being far more socially liberal than other counties in Eastern Washington due to the presence of Washington State University in Pullman. It is part of Washington's 5th congressional district and is represented by Republican Cathy McMorris Rodgers. Quite conservative, rural Whitman was one of only three counties in the state to be won by Barry Goldwater in 1964. Since that election, the county has been won by the winning candidate in all but three presidential elections, 1976, 2012, and 2016. Richard Nixon, Ronald Reagan, Bill Clinton, and George W. Bush each won the county twice.

In 2008, Barack Obama received 51.57% of the Whitman County vote. In 2012, he received 46.9% of the vote, with Mitt Romney winning with a 49.7% plurality. Whitman was the only county in eastern Washington to approve same-sex marriage via Referendum 74. It was the only county to vote in favor of Referendum 74 while voting for the Republican candidate for president. Whitman County voters also approved marijuana legalization via Initiative 502.

By 2016, the county was considered Democratic in regards to federal elections. Hillary Clinton won the county in 2016 and also voted for Patty Murray in 2016. However, Republican Bill Bryant won this county over incumbent Democrat Jay Inslee by a percentage point in the concurrent gubernatorial election. In the 2020 elections, the majority of the county voted for Democrat Joe Biden for president and re-elected Inslee for governor. Both received majority of the county vote with Inslee becoming the first Democratic gubernatorial candidate to win a county in Eastern Washington since Gary Locke in 2000. However, the county still votes Republican in congressional elections.

In 2020, 52.9% of residents voted for Biden while 42.9% voted for Trump, a 10% margin for Biden.

Economy
Whitman County has highly productive agriculture.  According to Heart of Washington, Whitman County produces more barley, wheat, dry peas, and lentils than any other county in the United States.

The county is also home to Schweitzer Engineering Laboratories in Pullman.

Education
Pullman is home to Washington State University, the state's land-grant university.

Communities

Cities
Colfax  (county seat)
Palouse
Pullman 
Tekoa

Towns

Albion
Colton
Endicott
Farmington
Garfield
La Crosse
Lamont
Malden
Oakesdale
Pine City
Rosalia
Saint John
Uniontown

Census-designated place
Steptoe

Unincorporated communities

Belmont
Diamond
Dusty
Ewan
Hay
Hooper
Johnson
Thornton
Winona

Ghost town
Elberton

Images

Communities

Geography

See also
National Register of Historic Places listings in Whitman County, Washington

References

External links

 Whitman County official website
 Whitman County Genealogical Society
 Whitman County Historical Society
 Whitman County Library with branches in 14 communities throughout Whitman County.
 Whitman County Heritage A collection of historic materials from the Whitman County Library and local partners.
 Whitman County @ State of Washington Office of Financial Management
 Port of Whitman County and Green IT Alliance (GITA)

 
1871 establishments in Washington Territory
Populated places established in 1871
Eastern Washington